The New Donskoy Cemetery (Новое Донское кладбище) is a 20th-century necropolis sprawling to the south from the Donskoy Monastery in the south-west of Central Moscow. It has been closed for new burials since the 1980s.

History 
The cemetery outside the monastery walls was established in 1910, when there was no more place for new burials inside the medieval monastery. The speaker of the first Russian parliament, Sergey Muromtsev, was among the first notables to be interred there. Maria Gartung, the daughter of Alexander Pushkin who served for Leo Tolstoy as a model for Anna Karenina, was buried in 1919.

After the Russian Revolution, scores of Soviet soldiers killed during the Battle of Moscow and people executed by NKVD were secretly buried at the Donskoy Cemetery. It is believed that the Mass graves from the era contain the remains of Mikhail Tukhachevsky, Pyotr Krasnov, Vsevolod Meyerhold, Isaac Babel, and other victims of Stalin's regime. The remains of painter Valentin Serov, composer Sergei Taneyev, and poet Vladimir Mayakovsky were exhumed and transferred to the more prestigious Novodevichy Cemetery.

In 1927 the former church of St. Seraphim was rebuilt to become the first crematorium in Moscow. Most of the mortal remains buried at the New Donskoy Cemetery are therefore interred in urns. The church featured extended vaults which seemed suitable to accommodate the technical equipment for the cremation of bodies. The new crematorium was opened in October 1927 and most of the individuals buried in the Kremlin Wall Necropolis were cremated here. Until the mid-1970s the Donskoy crematorium remained the only one of its kind in Moscow.

"Common Grave Number 1"

In 1930, Stalinist authorities dug a large pit in the east portion of the cemetery to act as a Mass grave for the cremated ashes of executed political prisoners from Joseph Stalin's Great Purge; the site was intentionally chosen for its isolation from normal burial sites due to its "shameful" history as Eastern Orthodox consecrated ground during the Tsarist era, which the Soviets had revoked as part of state atheism in the USSR. The ashes of numerous executed prisoners, both common and high-ranking—including notorious figures such as Nikolai Yezhov, Mikhail Tukhachevsky, Pavel Alexandrovich Alexandrov etc.were unceremoniously dumped here until the grave was filled and closed in 1942. The pit currently bears two markers, one erected during the Soviet era and simply reading "Common Grave Number One: Unclaimed Ashes from 1930–42." while the other was erected after 1989 and reads "Here lie the remains of the innocent victims of political repressions in 1930–42 who were shot. To their eternal memory."

Notable burials 
 Rudolf Abel (1903–1971)
 Anton Denikin (1872–1947)
 Vladimir Fogel (1902–1929)
 Ivan Ilyin (1883–1954)
 Vladimir Pikalov (1924–2003)
 Vladimir Kappel (1883–1920)
 Lev Kopelev (1912–1997)
 Sergei Khudyakov (1902–1950)
 Solomon Mikhoels (1890–1948)
 Konon Molody (1922–1970)
 Sergey Muromtsev (1850–1910)
 Faina Ranevskaya (1896–1984)
 Ivan Shmelyov (1873–1950)
 Aleksandr Solzhenitsyn (1918–2008)
 Pavel Sudoplatov (1907–1996)

Supposed secret burials 
 Anna Abrikosova (1882–1936)
 Isaak Babel (1894–1940)
 Vasily Blyukher (1889–1938)
 Milan Gorkić (1904–1937)
 Stanislav Kosior (1889–1939)
 Vsevolod Meyerhold (1874–1940)
 Evgeny Miller (1867–1939)
 Oleg Penkovsky (1919–1963)
 Mikhail Tukhachevsky (1893–1937)
 Pavel Alexandrovich Alexandrov (1866–1940)
 Alexander Ilyich Yegorov (1883–1939)
 Nikolai Yezhov (1895–1940)

References

External links 
 
 

1910 establishments in the Russian Empire
Cemeteries in Moscow

Mass graves in Russia